The following is a list of ecoregions in Oman, as identified by the Worldwide Fund for Nature (WWF).

Terrestrial ecoregions
Yemen lies on the boundary between two of the world's terrestrial biogeographic realms. The Afrotropical realm covers the mountainous southern and eastern fringe of the Arabian Peninsula as well as Sub-Saharan Africa and Madagascar. The Palearctic realm covers the interior of the Arabian Peninsula as well as temperate Eurasia and Northern Africa.

Temperate grasslands, savannas, and shrublands

 Al Hajar montane woodlands (Afrotropical)

Deserts and xeric shrublands

 Arabian Desert and East Sahero-Arabian xeric shrublands (Palearctic)
 Arabian Peninsula coastal fog desert (Afrotropical)
 Gulf of Oman desert and semi-desert (Afrotropical)
 Red Sea Nubo-Sindian tropical desert and semi-desert (Palearctic)
 Southwestern Arabian foothills savanna (Afrotropical)

Marine ecoregions
 Gulf of Oman
 Western Arabian Sea

References
 Burgess, Neil, Jennifer D’Amico Hales, Emma Underwood (2004). Terrestrial Ecoregions of Africa and Madagascar: A Conservation Assessment. Island Press, Washington DC.
 Spalding, Mark D., Helen E. Fox, Gerald R. Allen, Nick Davidson et al. "Marine Ecoregions of the World: A Bioregionalization of Coastal and Shelf Areas". Bioscience Vol. 57 No. 7, July/August 2007, pp. 573-583.

 
Oman
Ecoregions